Irrational Man is a 2015 American crime mystery drama film written and directed by Woody Allen, and starring Joaquin Phoenix, Emma Stone, Parker Posey and Jamie Blackley. The film was released on July 17, 2015, by Sony Pictures Classics in a limited release, later expanding wider.

Plot
Philosophy professor Abe Lucas joins the faculty at a small-town New England college campus. Abe is experiencing an existential crisis. He is depressed, sees no meaning in his life, and drinks excessively. Despite this, he catches the eye of two women: chemistry professor Rita Richards, and Jill Pollard, one of his students. Jill has a serious boyfriend and lives with her parents. Rita lives with her husband, but is dissatisfied with her marriage. Abe chooses to sleep with Rita but is careful to have only a platonic relationship with Jill. Abe's depression becomes even more apparent when he cannot get an erection during his first sexual experience with Rita.

At lunch in a diner, Abe and Jill overhear a conversation in the next booth; a woman says she will lose her children in a custody battle because of an unethical judge in family court. Abe is troubled by the injustice and decides to secretly help the woman by murdering the judge. Abe reasons he is unlikely to be caught because he does not know the judge. Having found a new purpose in life, his depression is lifted. He becomes happier and is able to have sex with Rita. He follows the judge for a while to learn his habits. After his weekly jog, the judge always buys a juice and sits on a bench to cool down. Abe decides that the best way to kill him is to poison him. He steals a key to the college's chemistry lab from Rita where he procures cyanide. He buys a juice from the same place the judge stops at, puts the poison in his juice cup, sits down on the same bench, then switches the juices while the judge is distracted. The judge dies from cyanide poisoning. Abe feels reborn, telling himself he has finally done something worthwhile by ridding the world of an evil man. Abe and Jill's friendship blossoms into a romance. Jill's boyfriend Roy learns of the relationship and breaks up with her.

Despite Abe's careful planning, Jill and Rita, who are friendly, begin to suspect Abe's involvement in the murder after piecing together clues, such as the missing key and Abe's presence in the chemistry lab. Rita decides that even if he is guilty, she wants to leave her husband and live with Abe.

Jill breaks into Abe's residence via a window and discovers damning notes. When she confronts him, Abe acknowledges his mistake. Jill chooses to call it quits on their romance. Jill pressures Abe to go to the police when an innocent guy is accused of the crime, threatening him that she would denounce him. Abe, who has lately begun to appreciate life, tries to murder Jill by shoving her down an elevator shaft, but trips and falls down the shaft to his death. Jill, who has reunited with Roy, is shown staring out to sea and thinking on her experiences with Abe towards the conclusion of the film.

Cast

Production

On May 2, 2014, it was announced that Woody Allen would write and direct an upcoming film in which Joaquin Phoenix would star. On May 6, Emma Stone joined the cast, marking her second film collaboration with Allen, as she previously co-starred in Allen's romantic comedy Magic in the Moonlight in 2014. On July 24, Parker Posey and Jamie Blackley also joined the cast of the film, which Allen produced along with his sister Letty Aronson and Stephen Tenenbaum.

Principal photography began on July 7, 2014, in Newport, Rhode Island, and lasted until the end of August. Crews were spotted filming outside at The Fastnet Pub in Newport.

The film was the last produced by Jack Rollins, who had produced Allen's films since the beginning of his filmmaking career in the late 1960s, before his death in June 2015.

Release
On January 29, 2015, it was announced Sony Pictures Classics had acquired all distribution rights to the film, marking it the eighth Woody Allen film to be released by Classics. The film's first trailer was released on April 29, 2015.

The film had its world premiere on May 16, 2015, at the 2015 Cannes Film Festival. The film began a limited release on July 17, 2015, and later a wide release on August 7, 2015.

Reception
Irrational Man received mixed reviews from critics. On the review aggregator website Rotten Tomatoes, the film scored a 46% approval rating, based on 206 reviews, with a rating average of 5.56/10. The site's consensus read: "Irrational Man may prove rewarding for the most ardent Joaquin Phoenix fans or Woody Allen apologists, but all others most likely need not apply." On Metacritic, which assigns a normalized rating, the film scored 53 out of 100, based on 43 critics, indicating "mixed or average reviews".

Peter Bradshaw of The Guardian gave the film two stars out of five, stating, "Woody Allen’s Irrational Man is another of the amiable but forgettable and underpowered jeux d’esprit that he produces with an almost somnambulist consistency and persistence. It’s a tongue-in-cheek mystery which is neither quite scary and serious enough to be suspenseful, nor witty or ironic enough to count as a comedy." Matt Zoller Seitz of RogerEbert.com gave the movie 1.5 stars out of four, writing, "It is not merely a bad film. It is a collection of notes for a film that never quite evolved to the rough draft stage, much less cohered into a finished movie. That makes it more dispiriting than other notorious Woody Allen misfires, like "Celebrity" and "Curse of the Jade Scorpion" and "Scoop," where at least you could kind of see what the filmmaker was going for, and sense the movie lurching in a certain direction even as it kept stumbling over its shoelaces and crashing into things."

Tim Robey of The Telegraph stated, "The main problem is the philosophical purchase Allen thinks his film is gaining: far from profundity of any sort, it ultimately peddles the thesis that killing people out of daft, misplaced idealism isn’t an especially wizard plan. Such schemes are all too apt to backfire – but Allen’s old touch is missing here, and even the backfiring is a damp squib." Richard Brody of The New Yorker added, "when the Dostoyevskian drama kicks in, Allen’s venomous speculations bring to the fore a tangle of conundrums and ironies, as if the director, nearing eighty, already had one foot in the next world and were looking back at this one with derision and rue." Eric Kohn of IndieWire gave the film B grade, observing, "Now comes 'Irrational Man,' a similar fusion of Allen's dominant modes that's decidedly more minor, but still a competent showcase of the way the productive filmmaker's voice remains effective with the right synthesis of material and cast."

The film grossed $27.4 million worldwide at the box office.

References

External links
 
 
 

2015 films
2015 crime drama films
2015 independent films
2010s mystery films
American crime drama films
American independent films
American mystery films
Films directed by Woody Allen
Films produced by Letty Aronson
Films produced by Stephen Tenenbaum
Films shot in Rhode Island
Films with screenplays by Woody Allen
Sony Pictures Classics films
Films set in Rhode Island
2010s English-language films
2010s American films